Chandra Monerawela (born 8 September 1937) is a Sri Lankan diplomat. He served as Sri Lankan High Commissioner to Singapore and to the United Kingdom.

Born in Kandy, Monerawela was educated at the Trinity College, Kandy and the University of Ceylon, Peradeniya. He joined the Ceylon Overseas Service in 1961. He served in the Ceylon's missions in Beijing from 1964 to 1967 and in Washington, D.C., from 1967 to 1970. From 1970 to 1974 he served as the Chief of protocol in the Ministry of External Affairs and Defence in Colombo. In 1974, he was posted to Bangkok as the Chargé d'affaires and Permanent representative to Economic and Social Commission for Asia and the Pacific. From 1980 to 1983, he served as the Director Economics Affairs at the Minister of Foreign Affairs. In 1984 he was appointed Sri Lankan High Commissioner to Singapore, before he was recalled and sent to London as Sri Lankan High Commissioner to the United Kingdom the same year to serve till 1990. He married  Rupa De Silva in 1965.

References

1937 births
Living people
People from Kandy
Alumni of the University of Ceylon (Peradeniya)
Alumni of Trinity College, Kandy
High Commissioners of Sri Lanka to Singapore
High Commissioners of Sri Lanka to the United Kingdom
Sri Lankan diplomats